sixxxxxx is the sixth extended play by Japanese recording artist and songwriter Ayumi Hamasaki. The EP was released on August 5, 2015 by Avex Trax and was produced by long-time collaborator Max Matsuura. With all the tracks written by Hamasaki herself, the EP features five original tracks and one hidden track to commemorate the "six" tracks. It was released as a stand-alone CD, a CD and DVD bundle and a CD and Blu-ray bundle.

Background
In April 2015, Hamasaki released her sixteenth studio album A One. Comprised with thirteen newly recorded tracks, Hamasaki stated in an interview that the album was her most personal and passionate album. Despite this, the album missed the top spot and reached number four on the Japanese Oricon Albums Chart and has sold over 52,000 units in Japan. She promoted the album during her Arena Tour 2015 A: Cirque de Minuit. In mid-April 2015 while she was on tour, Hamasaki confirmed work of a sixth extended play.

The EP's lead single, "Step by Step," was announced in April. Eventually it was announced that the song would be used as the theme song for the NHK drama Bijo to Danshi, starring Yukie Nakama. The song was released as an exclusively digital single on July 1, 2015, with July 1st serving as a digital B-side. It charted for three weeks and sold 28,432 units and in its first week it charted at number two.

The artwork for Sixxxxxx premiered in early July 2015. The photoshoot was created in conjunction with Numero Tokyo Magazine, with a theme of "Ayumi Hamasaki Moto." The three covers feature close-up black and white shots of Hamasaki's face. The title allegedly suggests that this is Hamasaki's sixth extended play and that it features six original tracks.

Promotion
To promote the album, Hamasaki conducted the Ayumi Hamasaki: Limited TA Live Tour, a concert tour that only members of her official fanclub, TeamAyu, were able to purchase and attend. This is her first TeamAyu member tour in twelve years. Hamasaki confirmed that stage production and costuming had begun and announced the tour throughout Japan, including the Osaka, Tokyo, and Fukuoka.

Track list

Charts

References

Ayumi Hamasaki EPs
2015 EPs
Avex Group EPs
Japanese-language EPs